The Arno, was a 1,825 ton, iron sailing ship with a length of , breadth of  and depth of . She was built by Charles Connell & Company, Glasgow, Scotland, for the Nourse Line, named after the Arno River in central Italy, which flows past Florence and Pisa to the Mediterranean Sea, and launched on 19 January 1893. She was primarily used for the transportation of Indian indentured labourers to the colonies. Details of some of these voyages are as follows:

In 1896 she was grounded at West Hartlepool, inward bound under tow from Bremen.

Arno was sold to Norwegian owners in 1910. On 10 October 1913 she left Fredrikstad for Pernambuco and was not seen or heard from again.

See also 
 Indian Indenture Ships to Fiji

References

External links 
Indian Immigrant Ship List

Indian indentureship in Trinidad and Tobago
Indian indenture ships to Fiji
Victorian-era passenger ships of the United Kingdom
Individual sailing vessels
1893 ships
Ships built in Glasgow
Maritime incidents in 1913
Missing ships
Ships lost with all hands
Sailing ships of Scotland
1893 establishments in Scotland